Upper Senegal and Niger was a colony in French West Africa created in 1904 from Senegambia and Niger.  Niger became a separate military district in 1911 and a separate colony in 1922, Upper Volta was split off in 1919, and the remainder reorganized as French Sudan in 1920. The capital was Bamako.

The colony issued a number of postage stamps during its short existence. The first issue was part of the 1906 omnibus issue of the French West Africa, consisting of 17 stamps in three designs: portraits of Louis Faidherbe, Eugene Ballay, and an oil palm, with values ranging from 1 centime to 5 francs. Another series of 17 followed in 1914, all of same design - a camel with its rider - but each printed in a different pair of colours.

In addition, in 1915 the 10c stamp of 1914 was surcharged an additional 5c and sold as a semi-postal stamp. Sets of postage due stamps were also issued in 1906 and 1914. Stamps of French Sudan superseded all of these in 1921.

See also
Postage stamps and postal history of Niger
Postage stamps and postal history of Senegal

References 

Upper Senegal and Niger